Jusqu’ aux p’tites heures (English: "Until the wee hours") is a studio album by Canadian folk band La Bottine Souriante. Released in 1991, it contains an assortment of reels as well as traditional songs with the addition of modern instruments. The theme of alcohol is recurrent in this album. The album was certified Platinum by the CRIA in December 2002.

Track listing
all songs arranged by La Bottine Souriante, except track 12, with additional arrangers specified.
 "La chanson du quéteux" (Ovila Légaré - arranged by Jean Fréchette)
 "Le reel de Pointe-au-Pic" (Traditional - arr. Denis Fréchette, J. Fréchette)
 "Un p'tit coup mesdames" (Traditional)
 "Nuit sauvage" (Michel Bordeleau - arr. J. Fréchette)
 "Par un dimanche au soir (ou Ninette)" (Traditional - arr. J. Fréchette)
 "L'Acadienne" (Traditional - arr. J. Fréchette)
 "Émilien" (Raymond Lévesque - arr. J. Fréchette)
 "Corps mort" (Traditional - arr. D. Fréchette, J. Fréchette) and "Fleur de Mandragore" (Bordeleau - arr. J. Fréchette)
 "Turlutte des 33 voleurs" (Michel Faubert)
 "Brandy Payette" (Traditional - arr. D. Fréchette, J. Fréchette)
 "Picoro" (Traditional)
 "«Dérap» de la guerre" (Yves Lambert)

Personnel
Régent Archambault, double bass, vocals
Michel Bordeleau, mandolin, violin, guitar, snare drum, vocals
Laflèche Doré, trumpet
Robert Ellis, bass trombone
Denis Fréchette, piano, piano accordion, vocals, brass arrangement
Jean Fréchette, saxophone, brass arrangement
Yves Lambert, melodeon, accordion, harmonica, vocals
Martin Racine, violin, vocals, guitar, piano accordion
André Verreault, trombone

Credits
Produced by Benjamin Kanters and La Bottine Souriante
Engineered by Benjamin Kanters
Assistant engineer: Isabelle Larin
Assistant producer: André Marchand
A&R: La Bottine Souriante
Recorded and mixed at Studio St-Charles, Longueuil (Canada)
Sleeve designer: Jean Bureau
Photography: Pierre Guzzo

References

1991 albums
La Bottine Souriante albums